Florence Peak is a mountain located on the Great Western Divide, a sub-range of the southern Sierra Nevada of California. It marks the southern boundary of Sequoia National Park. On the summit the Sequoia-Kings Canyon Wilderness, the John Krebs Wilderness and Golden Trout Wilderness meet.

Geography 
The Franklin Lakes, a series of tarns, lie in a cirque on north side of the peak and these drain into  the Kaweah River by way of Franklin Creek. The eastern slopes drain into the Kern River. The southwestern flank drains into the  Bullfrog Lakes and thence into the Little Kern River.

The high elevation of the peak means that most of the precipitation it receives falls as snow.

References

External links
 

Mountains of Sequoia National Park
Mountains of Tulare County, California
Inyo National Forest
Mountains of Northern California